Materion Corp. is a multinational company specializing in high-performance engineered materials. Among their products are precious and non-precious metals, inorganic chemicals, specialty coatings, beryllium, specialty engineered beryllium, beryllium copper alloys, ceramics, and engineered clad and plated metal systems.

The company's engineered materials are used in the telecommunications, consumer electronics, automotive medical, industrial components, aerospace, defense, and optical coating industries.

History
Beginning in the 1940s, Brush Wellman Inc. produced large amounts of beryllium for the United States government.

Brush Engineered Materials Inc. changed its name to Materion Corporation on March 8, 2011, and now trades under the symbol MTRN.

In March, 2017 Jugal K. Vijayvargiya was appointed president and chief executive officer of Materion Corporation, replacing Richard J. Hipple, who had served in that position for 11 years. Vijayvargiya was also named a director of the corporation. A graduate of the Ohio State University, Vijayvargiya spent 26 years at Delphi Corporation in a variety of management positions. Hipple will become executive chairman.

References

External links
Materion Stock and Shareholder Information
Materion SEC Filings

Companies listed on the New York Stock Exchange
Beryllium alloys